There is another Kouchibouguac River that empties into the Northumberland Strait at Beaubassin East in New Brunswick.

The Kouchibouguac River is a river in eastern New Brunswick, Canada, which empties into the Northumberland Strait. It is 72 kilometres (44.7 mi) long.

This river flows through Kouchibouguac National Park. The river's name means "river of the long tides" in Mi'kmaq.

During the 19th century, the white pine forests of the area were logged to provide masts and booms for the ships of the Royal Navy. Ships were built at the mouth of this river to transport the logs to Britain.

See also
List of rivers of New Brunswick

References

External links
 

Rivers of New Brunswick